Etota Bhalobashi (So much love) is a Bangladeshi television film, which was premiered on Maasranga Television, on April 7, 2016. The telefilm follows a romance genre. Etota Bhalobashi was created by Julius Iqbal and directed by Mahmudur Rahman Hime. The title track composed by Sajid Sarkar and sung by Tahsan Rahman Khan. Bangladesh's film production company Tiger Media Limited bought the album rights for the telefilm.

Etota Bhalobashi features Ziaul Faruq Apurbo, and Ishika Khan is lead roles.

Plot
The story starts during college days of Sanvi and Tropa. Sanvi falls in love with Tropa on first sight, but hesitates to tell her. Two meets outside their campus on a rainy day, where they get to know each other. Rain interrupts, and two comes under the same umbrella. During short conversation, Tropa reveals that she loves the rain, which later reveals to be his imagination.
Sanvi attempts to reveal his true feelings to her multiple times, but fails as she only sees him as a friend. Two gets to know each other more, and Sanvi confesses his love for her, but she tells him, she is still confused about him. Hearing that, Heartbroken Sanvi tries to prove his love by attempting to give his life for her. Tropa withness and confess her love for him.
Few months later, Sanvi sees Tropa with another man, and assumes that she is cheating on him. He confronts her, resulting in a heated argument, which ends up in breakup. It is later revealed that Tropa is suffering from bipolar depression and the breakup was pre-planned by him as he did not want her to suffer.

Years later, during adulthood, Tropa sees an artwork by Sanvi at an exhibition, who now is a famous photographer. She finds out that he is leaving for abroad, and gets to airport to stop him. However, the flight departs before she reaches. While driving back home, Tropa sees Sanvi taking pictures by the roadside. It is raining, and the setting is just like how it was in Sanvi's imagination. She runs to him, both hugs each other and recalls their good memories.

Cast
 Ziaul Faruq Apurba as Sanvi Rahman
 Ishika Khan as Tropa
 Rajib Saleheen
 Pronil Shamsad Jadid
 Khalekujjaman
 Sabhiha

Soundtrack

References

External links
 Official Facebook
 Official Trailer

Bangladeshi drama television series
Bangladeshi television films
Bengali-language Bangladeshi films
Bengali-language television programming in Bangladesh
Films scored by Sajid Sarkar
2016 films